Rahnuyeh (also Romanized as Rāhnūyeh; also known as Rāhnau and Rānī) is a village in Rahmat Rural District, Seyyedan District, Marvdasht County, Fars Province, Iran. At the 2006 census, its population was 689, in 162 families.

References 

Populated places in Marvdasht County